Christos Apostolidis (born in 1952) is a former Greek footballer (wing back) and coach.

Career 
He started his career as an amateur in A.O. Keravnos Vathis and played professionally for Ethnikos Piraeus before being transferred to Panachaiki in the 1976–77 season. He stayed in Patras until the mid-eighties.

Statistics
Christos Apostolidis had 177 First Division appearances for Panachaiki and scored 20 goals.

References

1952 births
Living people
Greek footballers
Panachaiki F.C. players
Ethnikos Piraeus F.C. players
Association football wing halves
People from Kilkis (regional unit)
Footballers from Central Macedonia